Nomsa Buthelezi-Shezi (born 7 April 1982), is a South African actress and television presenter. She is best known for the roles in the television serials such as; Abo Mzala, Isibaya, Lockdown and The Queen (South African TV series).

Personal life
Buthelezi was born on 7 April 1982 in Alexandra, Gauteng, South Africa to Vezi and Magdalene. She has 2 brothers: Moses and Tony. Moses died in July 2021. She completed her primary education in a hometown, and later completed high school education at the age of 16. Then she completed a two-year course at the COSAC drama academy.

Initially, she was dated to Unathi Ndondzwana, who died after suffered a stroke in 2013. She is a lesbian and married to longtime partner Zandile Shezi, where the wedding was celebrated on 28 September 2019 at a ceremony in Alexandra, Johannesburg. She has two children: Olwethu, Lindi.

Career
Before entering to television, she had a 17 long career in theatre. In 2008, she played the role of a female "Metro police officer" in the Vodacom "Summer Loving" commercial until 2009. In 2011, she joined with the SABC1 sitcom Abo Mzala and played the role "Thandi" until the end of third season. She later won the award for the Best Supporting Actress in TV Comedy category at the South African Film and Television Awards (SAFTA). Then in 2013, she appeared in the Mzansi Magic sitcom Samsokolo with the role "Dudu". In the following year, she acted in the Vuzu sitcom Check Coast. Then she played the role "Awelani" in the soapie Muvhango.

In 2013, she joined with the season one of Mzansi Magic soap opera Isibaya where she played role of "Ma Mnisi". The role became very popular, where she continued to play the role for seven consecutive years until 2020. In the meantime in 2017, she became the presenter on Our Perfect Wedding from Season 7 to season 11. Meanwhile, in the same year, she played the role "Slender" in the Mzansi Magic prison drama Lockdown until 2019. After that serial, she joined with popular SABC1 soap opera Generations: The Legacy, where she played the role "Boipelo". In 2014, she was nominated for the Best Supporting Actress in TV Comedy category for her role in the serial Check Coast at the SAFTA. Apart from television, she also acted in the films: For Love and Broken Bones and The Adventures of Supermama. In 2019, she co-hosted the show "Fragrance Your Life" with Thembsie Matu aired on e.tv.

Filmography

|- 
2021|| " the adventures of supermama"||Doris(supermama)
|Telenovela||

References

External links
 IMDb

1982 births
Living people
South African film actresses
21st-century South African actresses
South African television actresses
South African stage actresses
People from Gauteng